Total Eclipse is the third album of fusion drummer Billy Cobham. The album was released in 1974. It comprises eight songs, all written by Billy Cobham. The album peaked number 6 in the Billboard Jazz album chart, number 12 in the R&B album chart, and number 36 in the Billboard pop albums chart.

Track listing
All selections written by Billy Cobham.

Side one
 "Solarization"" – 11:09
a. "Solarization" – 3:00
b. "Second Phase" – 1:43
c. "Crescent Sun" – 2:40
d. "Voyage" – 2:56
e. "Solarization-Recapitulation" – 0:50
 "Lunarputians – 2:32
 "Total Eclipse" – 5:59
 "Bandits" – 2:30

Side two
 "Moon Germs" – 4:55
 "The Moon Ain't Made of Green Cheese" – 0:56
 "Sea of Tranquility" – 10:44
 "Last Frontier" – 5:22

Personnel
The personnel on all sections is:
 John Abercrombie – electric & ovation guitars
 Michael Brecker – flute, soprano & tenor saxes
 Randy Brecker – trumpet, flugelhorn
 Glenn Ferris – tenor & bass trombones
 Billy Cobham – traps, timpani, acoustic piano on "The Moon Ain't Made Of Green Cheese" & "Last Frontier"
 Milcho Leviev – keyboards
 Alex Blake – electric bass

Additional musicians
 David Earle Johnson – congas on "Solarization" & "Moon Germs"
 Sue Evans – marimba on "Solarization"
 Cornell Dupree – first guitar solo on "Moon Germs"

Credits
 Ken Scott – recording and re-mixing engineer
 Bob Warner – tape operator & assistant
 Gilbert Stone – cover illustration
 Bob Defrin – art direction

Charts

References

External links
 

1974 albums
Albums produced by Ken Scott
Albums recorded at Electric Lady Studios
Atlantic Records albums
Billy Cobham albums
Albums recorded at Trident Studios